Lock In is a science fiction police procedural novel by American writer John Scalzi. The book was published by Tor Books on August 26, 2014. The audiobook of the novel was released in two versions, one narrated by Wil Wheaton and the other by Amber Benson.

The sequel to this novel is titled Head On, which was released in April 2018.

Plot summary
The world is exposed to a highly contagious virus. Most who get sick experience nothing worse than flu-like symptoms. For 1%, the virus causes the victims to be fully awake, but unable to move or respond to stimulus. This is known as "Lock In", and resembles the real condition known as locked-in syndrome. The illness comes to be known as "Haden's Syndrome" with its victims called "Hadens". Humanoid robotic personal transport units controlled by a Haden's brain (nicknamed "Threeps" after C-3PO from Star Wars) are developed as the primary way for a Haden to interact with the outside world.

Twenty five years after the initial virus exposure, FBI agents Chris Shane (who is a Haden) and Leslie Vann are assigned to a Haden-related murder, with a suspect who is an "Integrator" – someone who can let a Haden use their bodies. If the Integrator was carrying a Haden, then finding the suspect for the murder is complicated. Further Integrator-Haden related murders occur, making the case larger than expected, and as Shane and Vann dig deeper, they uncover a plot to completely shake up the Haden economy.

Companion novella
Lock In is accompanied by a novella, Unlocked: An Oral History of Haden's Syndrome, an epistolary work which provides background details about the origins of the epidemic. Chris Shane, the protagonist of Lock In, is briefly mentioned in Unlocked.

Reception

The Milwaukee Journal Sentinel called it "compulsively readable", and praised Scalzi for having "a combination of skill, vision and intuition."

An analysis at Io9 suggested that, if not for the Sad Puppies ballot-manipulation campaign, Lock In would have been a finalist for the 2015 Hugo Award for Best Novel.

Legendary Television acquired the rights to Lock In to adapt it into a TV pilot in 2014. However, sometime before March 2017 the TV rights were given up by Legendary.

References

2014 science fiction novels
2014 American novels
Police procedurals
English-language novels
Tor Books books
Novels by John Scalzi
Novels about the Federal Bureau of Investigation
Novels about viral outbreaks